Clifford Mulenga (born 5 August 1987) is a Zambian professional footballer who plays as a left winger for Forest Rangers F.C.

Career
Mulenga was born in Kabompo, Zambia.

was part of the Zambian 2006 African Nations Cup team who finished third in group C in the first round of competition, thus failing to secure qualification for the quarter-finals.

Mulenga is known to be a quick and creative winger whose qualities have been praised as rare and akin to Zambian great Kalusha Bwalya. When playing for the Zambian U-20s he caught the eye of several European clubs most notably Spanish giants Real Madrid and PSV Eindhoven. His silky skills were demonstrated especially against the Nigerian U-20s at the African Youth Championships when his team lost in the semi-finals, a game which saw him give a man of the match performance only to be blighted by receiving a red card as a result of a petulant altercation with one of his opponents.
 
Prior to the 2008 Africa Cup of Nations a dispute arose as to which club Mulenga belonged to University of Pretoria F.C. claimed he was on their books however he caused controversy with the Zambian press when the nation's football authority FAZ, announced he was to join Israeli side Maccabi Petah Tikva from Örgryte IS the Swedish side which acquired him on loan from the University of Pretoria.

On 2 February 2008, Mulenga was named The 2007 Glo-CAF Young Player of the Year beating off competition from Congo Brazzaville’s Franchel Ibara and Nigeria’s Oseni Gani both of whom have been touted as future African stars.

The deal with Maccabi Petach Tikva fell through and he signed for Premier Soccer league team Bidvest Wits. In July 2009 he was trial by Maccabi Petach Tikva again but the club decided to not sign him. He consequently signed for the Mpumalanga Black Aces.

He has also played for Bloemfontein Celtic and SuperSport United.

Mulenga returned Mpumalanga Black Aces in September 2013 on a three-year contract. In August 2014, he signs a contract with Ajax Cape Town for one season.

Career statistics
Scores and results list Zambia's goal tally first.

Honours
Zambia
Africa Cup of Nations: 2012

Individual
 Glo-CAF Young Player of the Year: 2007

References

External links

Living people
1987 births
People from Kabompo District
Association football midfielders
Zambian footballers
Zambia international footballers
Africa Cup of Nations-winning players
2006 Africa Cup of Nations players
2008 Africa Cup of Nations players
2010 Africa Cup of Nations players
2012 Africa Cup of Nations players
Allsvenskan players
University of Pretoria F.C. players
Örgryte IS players
Bidvest Wits F.C. players
Thanda Royal Zulu F.C. players
Bloemfontein Celtic F.C. players
SuperSport United F.C. players
Cape Town Spurs F.C. players
ZESCO United F.C. players
Moroka Swallows F.C. players
Mbombela United F.C. players
Zambian expatriate footballers
Expatriate soccer players in South Africa
Zambian expatriate sportspeople in South Africa
Expatriate footballers in Sweden
Zambian expatriate sportspeople in Sweden